General elections were held in the Khmer Republic in September 1972, the first after the 1970 coup. Elections for the National Assembly took place on 3 September and were contested by the Social Republican Party and Pracheachon (although the latter only had 10 candidates), whilst they were boycotted by the Republican Party and the Democratic Party in protest at the new electoral law. The SRP won all 126 seats with 99.1% of valid votes. Elections for the Senate were held on 17 September, with the SRP winning all 32 seats.

Results

National Assembly

Senate

References

Cambodia
Elections in Cambodia
1972 in Cambodia
Election and referendum articles with incomplete results